Miroslav "Miro" Žbirka (21 October 1952 – 10 November 2021) was a Slovak pop and rock singer and songwriter, widely popular in 1980s Czechoslovakia. Born in Bratislava to a Slovak father and an English mother, he sang in Slovak, English, and Czech. He sometimes recorded in London, but lived in Slovakia and since early 1990s in Prague, Czech Republic, where he died.

In the late 1970s, Žbirka co-founded two Czechoslovak pop music bands, Modus and Limit. In 1982, he rose to fame by winning the annual Zlatý slavík award for the best male singer in Czechoslovakia. After the 1992 division of Czechoslovakia, he repeated this achievement in the Slovak annual Slávik Awards, coming number one in the annual end of year charts in 2002, 2004 and 2005.

Žbirka had some performances with Jon Anderson in 2012. Asteroid 5895 Žbirka, discovered by Czech astronomer Zdeňka Vávrová in 1982, was named in his honor (the official  was published by the Minor Planet Center on 27 August 2019). He died from pneumonia in Prague on 10 November 2021, leaving behind recorded vocals for his 15th studio album, Posledné veci (Last Things), which was completed by his son David Žbirka in Konk Studios by May 2022.

Discography

Studio albums
 1980: Doktor Sen
 1982: Sezónne lásky
 1983: Roky a dni
 1984: Nemoderný chalan
 1986: Chlapec z ulice
 1988: Zlomky poznania
 1990: K.O.
 1993: Songs for Children (designed for children)
 1994: Samozrejmý svet
 1997: Meky
 1999: Songs for Boys & Girls (designed for children)
 2001: Modrý album
 2005: Dúhy
 2009: Empatia
 2015: Miro
 2018: Double Album
 2022: Posledné veci

Export albums
 1981: Doctor Dream (aka Miro and/or Like a Hero)
 1982: Light of My Life
 1983: A Giant Step (aka Dear Boy)
 1990: Step by Step

Awards

Major awards

Music polls

References
General

Specific

Bibliography

Further reading

External links

 
 
 Miroslav Žbirka at Billboard
 
 

1952 births
2021 deaths
Slovak expatriates in the Czech Republic
20th-century Slovak male singers
Slovak people of English descent
Modus (band) members
Zlatý slavík winners
21st-century Slovak male singers
Czechoslovak male singers
Musicians from Bratislava
Deaths from pneumonia in the Czech Republic
Recipients of Medal of Merit (Czech Republic)